Synchronized Barangay and Sangguniang Kabataan (SK) elections were held for the first time in the Philippines on July 15, 2002. The elections were now synchronized after the passage of Republic Act No. 9164 which was approved on March 19, 2002, by the 12th Congress of the Philippines. During the voter's registration from May 21 – 22 2002 had poor turnout, prompted calls for the abolition of SK.

Sources
Official Website of the Commission on Elections
Republic Act No. 9164

2002
2002 elections in the Philippines
Barangay and Sangguniang Kabataan elections
July 2002 events in the Philippines